Ayashi may refer to:
 3994 Ayashi, a main-belt asteroid
 Ayashi Station, a railway station in Japan
 Essam Ayashi (born 1999), an Israeli footballer